Shardul Narendra Thakur (born 16 October 1991) is an Indian international cricketer. He is a bowler  who bats right-handed and bowls right arm medium pace.

Domestic career
Thakur was initially criticized for his lack of height for a fast bowler (he is 5 ft 9 in) and for being overweight for some time (83 kg) but he ultimately became a part of Mumbai domestic team.

In November 2012, he made his first-class debut for Mumbai against Rajasthan at Jaipur in the 2012–13 Ranji Trophy. He did not have a good start to his career as he took four wickets at a bowling average of 82.0 from his first four games. In 2013–14 Ranji season, he took 27 wickets at 26.25 from six games, with one five-wicket haul. In the 2014-15 Ranji season, he took 48 wickets at 20.81 from ten games with five five-wicket hauls.
He made his List A debut on 27 February 2014, for Mumbai in the 2013–14 Vijay Hazare Trophy.

In 2015-16 Ranji Trophy final, he took eight wickets against Saurashtra and led Mumbai to win its 41st Ranji Trophy title.

International career
He was named in India's 16-man squad for India's Test tour of West Indies in 2016, but he did not play. In August 2017, he was named in India's limited-overs squad for the series against Sri Lanka. He made his One Day International (ODI) debut on 31 August 2017 against Sri Lanka.

He became the second Indian cricketer to wear the number 10 jersey after Sachin Tendulkar, which raised various controversial comments in social media. Later, he changed his jersey number to 54 due to controversy. On 29 November 2017, Board of Control for Cricket in India (BCCI) retired Tendulkar's No. 10 jersey.

He made his Twenty20 International (T20I) debut for India against South Africa on 21 February 2018.

In March 2018, he was selected to play in the 2018 Nidahas Trophy. In a match against Sri Lanka he took a career best 4-27  to bring the game back to India's favour, winning the Man Of the Match award. He finished with 6 wickets from 5 matches at an average of 29.33.

In May 2018, he was named in India's Test squad for the one-off Test against Afghanistan in June 2018, but did not play.

In October 2018, he made his Test debut against the West Indies, making him the 294th player to represent Team India in Tests. His debut ended after bowling just 10 deliveries due to suffering from a groin strain in his right leg.
In the historic Gabba Test vs Australia, Shardul made 67 in the first innings and took a total of 7 wickets in that match.
Thakur was included in the India squad for the 2021 England tour. He was employed as an extra seam bowler in the First Test at Nottingham. An injury ruled him out of the next two Tests before he returned for the Fourth Test at the Oval. He made 57 in 36 balls in India's first innings, reaching his half-century in 31 balls, the fastest in Tests played in England. In the second innings, he scored 60 in 72 balls to help India post 466. He took three crucial wickets with the ball, dismissing Ollie Pope for 81 in the first innings, and Rory Burns and Joe Root in the second, and was instrumental in securing his team's victory. Thakur finished the series with 117 runs at 39 with the bat, while claiming seven wickets at 22 with the ball. The Guardian wrote, "The journeyman bowler who bats transformed himself into Kapil Dev, repeatedly delivering a considered counter-attack with bat and ball that permitted not a shred of self-doubt. Though his bowling might be specifically suited to English conditions, he made the absolute most of his talents."

In September 2021, Thakur was named as one of three reserve players in India's squad for the T20 World Cup to be held in October. On 13 October, Thakur replaced Axar Patel in India's main squad for the tournament. He was included in the playing eleven for two games of the tournament.

In the second Test match against South Africa at the Wanderers Stadium in January 2022, Shardul Thakur registered his first five-wicket haul in Test matches, and also registered the best bowling figures for an Indian bowler against South Africa. His figures were 7/61, which helped India bowl out South Africa for 229. He also provided a quickfire cameo of 28 runs to help increase India's lead in the second innings, however India lost the match. Thakur's match figures were 8/108.

In January 2023, Thakur scored a total of 6 wickets in the ODI series vs NZ. Also he became Player of the match in the 3rd ODI by scoring 25 runs with bat and 3 wickets.

IPL  career 
Thakur was signed by Kings XI Punjab at the 2014 IPL player auction ahead of the 2015 season of Indian Premier League and made his debut against Delhi Daredevils, taking one wicket in his four overs. In March 2017, he was acquired by Rising Pune Supergiants for the tenth season of the IPL and in January 2018, was bought by Chennai Super Kings ahead of the next season.

In 2019 Chennai reached the IPL final; Thakur took two wickets but was out off the final ball of the match with two runs required for victory. In 2021 he was the leading wicket-taker for Chennai with 21 wickets during the season.

In February 2022, he was bought by Delhi Capitals in the auction for the 2022 Indian Premier League tournament. After playing in 14 matches during the season, in November 2022 he was traded to the Kolkata Knight Riders in exchange for Aman Khan ahead of the auctions for the 2023 season of IPL.

Personal life
In November 2021, Thakur got engaged to Mittali Parulkar. In February 2023, Shardul Thakur married Mittali Parulkar.

References

External links

Twitter profile

Living people
1991 births
Indian cricketers
India Test cricketers
India One Day International cricketers
India Twenty20 International cricketers
Mumbai cricketers
West Zone cricketers
Punjab Kings cricketers
People from Palghar district
Chennai Super Kings cricketers
Delhi Capitals cricketers
People from Palghar
India Blue cricketers